Eötvös is the remains of a lunar impact crater on the far side of the Moon. It lies to the north-northwest of the walled plain Roche, and east-southeast of the equally ruined Bolyai.

Only the northwestern section of the crater's rim survives, the remainder now forming a battered, uneven circular rise. The rim is nearly non-existent along the southeast where it joins an uneven plain reaching the rim of Roche. Small craters lie along the rim to the northeast and one to the southwest. The interior floor is relatively level, but marked by a number of small craterlets as well as palimpsests, meaning circular rises in the surface that are now scarcely recognizable as craters.

Satellite craters 
By convention these features are identified on Lunar maps by placing the letter on the side of the crater midpoint that is closest to Eötvös.

References 

 
 
 
 
 
 
 
 
 
 
 
 

Impact craters on the Moon